is a passenger railway station located in the city of Ōtsu, Shiga Prefecture, Japan, operated by the private railway company Keihan Electric Railway. The station is located underneath the elevated tracks of the Kosei Line of West Japan Railway Company, and passenger interchange is possible with JR West Ōtsukyō Station, although the stations are not physically connected.

Lines

Station layout
The station consists of two opposed unnumbered side platforms connected by a level crossing. The station is unattended.

Platforms

Adjacent stations

History
The station was constructed at the middle position of two closed stations: Yamagami Station (山上駅), suspended on May 15, 1945 and closed upon the opening of Ōjiyama Station, and Sazanami Station (漣駅), closed on August 15, 1944. Due to a road construction project, the station was moved 52 meters north to the present location on March 18, 2006 from the original location.

The station name was changed to Keihan-otsukyo on March 17, 2018.

Passenger statistics
In fiscal 2018, the station was used by an average of 2997 passengers daily (boarding passengers only).

Surrounding area
JR West Ōtsukyō Station
 Ōjiyama Sports Park
 Biwako Boat Racecourse
 Otsu Municipal Prince Yama Junior High School

See also
List of railway stations in Japan

References

External links

Keihan official home page

Railway stations in Shiga Prefecture
Stations of Keihan Electric Railway
Railway stations in Japan opened in 1946
Railway stations in Ōtsu